Elif Ekşi (born 21 March 1967) is a Turkish archer. She competed at the 1988 Summer Olympics, the 1992 Summer Olympics and the 1996 Summer Olympics.

References

1967 births
Living people
Turkish female archers
Olympic archers of Turkey
Archers at the 1988 Summer Olympics
Archers at the 1992 Summer Olympics
Archers at the 1996 Summer Olympics
Place of birth missing (living people)
20th-century Turkish sportswomen